Peter Ording (born 22 December 1976 in Stade) is a German rower.

References

 

1976 births
Living people
German male rowers
People from Stade
World Rowing Championships medalists for Germany
Sportspeople from Lower Saxony